Ajuba (also Ajooba) may refer to:

Ajuba, name of the protein encoded by the JUB (gene)
Ajooba, a 1991 Bollywood film